The 2019–20 season was Olympiacos's 61st consecutive season in the Super League 1 and their 95th year in existence.

Players

First team

Out on loan

Backroom staff

Coaching staff

Transfers

In

 Total Spending: €15.21M

Out

 Total Income: €27.95M

Net Income:  €12.74M

Friendlies

Competitions

Overall

Overview 

{| class="wikitable" style="text-align: center"
|-
!rowspan=2|Competition
!colspan=8|Record
|-
!
!
!
!
!
!
!
!
|-
| Super League 1

|-
| Greek Cup

|-
| UEFA Champions League

|-
| UEFA Europa League

|-
! Total

Super League 1 Greece

League table

Results summary

Results by matchday

Regular season matches

Play-off round matches

Greek Football Cup

Round of 16

Quarter-finals

Semi-finals

Final

UEFA Champions League

Second qualifying round

Third qualifying round

Play-off round

Group stage

UEFA Europa League

Knockout phase

Round of 32

Round of 16

Squad statistics

Appearances

Goalscorers 

 

Own goals: 2

References

External links 
 Official Website of Olympiacos Piraeus 

Olympiacos F.C. seasons
Olympiacos
Olympiacos
Olympiacos
Greek football championship-winning seasons